Nicolás Cabrera (1913–1989), was a Spanish physicist who did important work on the theories of crystal growth (specifically the Burton–Cabrera–Frank theory) and the oxidisation of metals. He was the son of another famous Spanish physicist Blas Cabrera and the father of American Physicist Blas Cabrera Navarro. He spent many years in exile during the Francoist State. He was Professor of the Department of physics in the University of Virginia, where he worked from 1952. He became known for his interests in engineering and material science. He founded the physics department and was a professor at the Autonomous University of Madrid (UAM), from 1971. He is considered to have given an impulse to the study of physics in Spain from the time of his return. For a time Javier Solana, whom he met at the University of Virginia, was his assistant in Madrid. Solana has described him as being a brilliant man but badly organized. The Nicolás Cabrera Institute, founded in 1989 in the UAM, is named after him.

External links

1913 births
1989 deaths
Spanish physicists
Fellows of the American Physical Society